Sheela is a Malayalam actress.

Sheela may also refer to:

 Sheela (given name), an Indian feminine given name
 M. S. Sheela, Indian vocalist
 Ma Anand Sheela (born 1949), Indian–American–Swiss criminal who pleaded guilty to attempted murder and assault
 Sheela (film), a 1935 Punjabi-language film
 Sheela na gig, figurative carvings of naked women found throughout Europe

See also
Sheila
Shiela
Shila (disambiguation)